Bruce Griffith (October 28, 1867 – February 13, 1956) was an American college football player and coach, missionary, and postmaster. He was the captain of the Franklin & Marshall College football team in Lancaster, Pennsylvania from 1891 to 1892, during a period of time when the captain also served as the team's head coach. Griffith led the school to a record of 6–7.

Biography
Griffith was born on October 28, 1867, in Pavia Township, Bedford County, Pennsylvania. He attended Franklin & Marshall College, where he trained for the seminary and played football as an end. He moved to Wichita, Kansas in the 1890s, serving there as a missionary pastor for the Reformed Church before working in the insurance business with Aetna. 

During the early 1900s, Griffith was commissioned as a colonel in the Kansas National Guard. During World War I, he served as a lieutenant colonel with the 130th Field Artillery Regiment at Fort Sill. U.S. President Herbert Hoover appointed Griffith as postmaster of Wichita, an office he held for four years.

Death
Griffith died on February 13, 1956, at Winters U.S. Veterans Hospital, in Topeka, Kansas.

Head coaching record

References

External links
 

1867 births
1956 deaths
19th-century players of American football
Aetna employees
American businesspeople in insurance
American football ends
American Protestant missionaries
Franklin & Marshall Diplomats football coaches
Franklin & Marshall Diplomats football players
Kansas postmasters
Reformed Church in America ministers
United States Army officers
United States Army personnel of World War I
People from Bedford County, Pennsylvania
Coaches of American football from Pennsylvania
Coaches of American football from Kansas
Players of American football from Pennsylvania
Players of American football from Wichita, Kansas
Military personnel from Pennsylvania